Rzgów Pierwszy  ("First Rzgów", as distinct from the neighbouring Rzgów Drugi, "Second Rzgów") is a village in Konin County, Greater Poland Voivodeship, in west-central Poland. It is the seat of the gmina (administrative district) called Gmina Rzgów.

References

Villages in Konin County